The British Breeders Stakes formerly known as Produce Stakes is a greyhound racing competition held annually at Nottingham Greyhound Stadium. It was originally known as the British Breeders Forum Produce Stakes.

It was inaugurated in 1982 at Harringay Stadium but has moved home several times. Following the closure of Harringay in 1987 the competition switched to Wembley. In 1993 a Madonna concert forced the event to be switched to sister track Hall Green Stadium where it stayed until 2008. The Greyhound Racing Association allowed Nottingham to have the competition rights from 2009.

Past winners

Venues 
1983–1987 (Harringay 475 metres)
1988–1992 (Wembley 490 metres)
1993–2008 (Hall Green 480 metres)
2009–present (Nottingham 500 metres)

References

Greyhound racing competitions in the United Kingdom
Sport in Nottingham
Recurring sporting events established in 1983